The Vuelta a Cuba (English: Tour of Cuba) was a multi-day road bicycle racing stage race held annually each February in Cuba. It was held from 1964 to 2010.  When the UCI Continental Circuits were created in 2005, the Vuelta a Cuba was added to the UCI America Tour schedule.

Past winners

References

Cycle races in Cuba
UCI America Tour races
Recurring sporting events established in 1964
1964 establishments in Cuba
Annual sporting events in Cuba
Winter events in Cuba
Defunct cycling races in Cuba